Melanoplus foedus, the striped sand grasshopper, is a species of spur-throated grasshopper in the family Acrididae. It is found in North America.

Subspecies
These three subspecies belong to the species Melanoplus foedus:
 Melanoplus foedus fluviatilis Bruner, 1897 i c g
 Melanoplus foedus foedus Scudder, 1878 i c g
 Melanoplus foedus iselyi Hebard, 1936 i c g
Data sources: i = ITIS, c = Catalogue of Life, g = GBIF, b = Bugguide.net

References

External links

 

Melanoplinae
Articles created by Qbugbot
Insects described in 1878